Listed below are the dates and results for the 1978 FIFA World Cup qualification rounds for the Asian and Oceanian zone (AFC and OFC). For an overview of the qualification rounds, see the article 1978 FIFA World Cup qualification.

A total of 21 AFC and OFC teams and Israel entered the competition. However, South Vietnam could not compete after being annexed by Vietnam. The Asian zone was allocated 1 place (out of 16) in the final tournament.

Format
There would be two rounds of play:
First Round: The 21 teams would be divided into 5 groups. The groups had different rules, as follows:
 Group 1 had 6 teams. The teams played against each other once in Singapore. The top 2 teams after the group matches played against each other in a single match. The winner would advance to the Final Round.
 Groups 2 and 3 had 4 teams each. The teams played against each other on a home-and-away basis. The group winners would qualify.
 Group 4 had 4 teams. The teams played against each other twice in Qatar. The group winner would qualify.
 Group 5 had 3 teams. The teams played against each other on a home-and-away basis. The group winner would qualify.
Final Round: The 5 teams played against each other on a home-and-away basis. The group winner would qualify.

First round

Group 1

 

 

 

 

 

 

 

 

 

Hong Kong and Singapore finished in the top two places, and a play-off was played to decide who would advance to the Final Round.

Hong Kong advanced to the Final Round.

Group 2

 

 

 

 

 

Korea Republic advanced to the Final Round.

Group 3

 

 

 

 

 

Iran advanced to the Final Round.

Group 4

 

 

 

 

 

Kuwait advanced to the Final Round.

Group 5

 

 

 

 

 

Australia advanced to the Final Round.

Final round

 

 

 

 

 

 

 

 

 

 

 

 

 

 

 

 

 

 

 

Iran qualified.

Qualified teams
The following team from AFC qualified for the final tournament.

1 Bold indicates champions for that year. Italic indicates hosts for that year.

Goalscorers

7 goals

 Keith Nelson

6 goals

 John Kosmina
 Peter Ollerton
 Faisal Al-Dakhil

5 goals

 Ghafour Jahani
 Cha Bum-Kun

4 goals

 Chung Chor Wai
 Hassan Roshan
 Abdulaziz Al-Anberi
 Jasem Yaqoub
 James Wong

3 goals

 Attila Abonyi
 Jimmy Rooney
 Kwok Ka Ming
 Wun Chee Keung
 Fat'hi Kameel Fayaz Matar Marzouq
 Steve Sumner
 Park Sang-In
 Jesdaporn Naphatalung

2 goals

 Fuad Abou Shaqr
 Lau Wing Yip
 Hossein Kazerani
 Gholam Hossein Mazloumi
 Oded Machnes
 Hamad Khalid Bo Hamad
 Isa Bakar
 Quah Kim Song
 Choi Jong-Duk
 Kim Jae-Han
 Lee Young-Moo
 Vidthaya Laohakul
 Niwat Srisawat

1 goal

 Murray Barnes
 Colin Bennett
 Ibrahim Al Farhan
 Ebrahim Zowayed
 Chan Fat Chi
 Fung Chi Ming
 Tang Hung Cheong
 Junaedi Abdillah
 Anjas Asmara
 Iswadi Idris
 Waskito Kaihun
 Andi Lala
 Ronny Pattinasarany
 Risdianto
 Behtash Fariba
 Habib Khabiri
 Ali Parvin
 Habib Shareefi
 Mohsin Yousifi
 Haim Bar
 Uri Malmilian
 Itzhak Peretz
 Ibrahim Mohammed Al Duraihem
 Farouk Ibrahim Al Awadi Al Saleh
 Badr Abdul Hameed Bo Abbas
 Abdullah Yousuf Ma'yoof
 Bakri Ibni
 Clive Campbell
 Dave Taylor
 Kevin Weymouth
 Anbar Bashir Abubakr
 Hassan Myuter Saied Al Suwaidi
 Mansour Muftah Faraj Bekhit
 Samir Sultan Al Fahad
 Saoud Al Gassem Mohammed Bo Saeed
 Mohammed Abdul Ghani
 Mohammed Noh Hussein
 Dollah Kassim
 Suriamurthy Rajagopal
 Huh Jung-Moo
 Kim Ho-Kon
 Abdul Hamid Al Katbi
 Marwan Khalifa Khouri
 Chang Kuo Chi
 Cherdsak Chaiyabutr

1 own goal

 Lo Chih Tsong (playing against New Zealand)

See also
1978 FIFA World Cup qualification
1978 FIFA World Cup qualification (UEFA)
1978 FIFA World Cup qualification (CONMEBOL)
1978 FIFA World Cup qualification (CONCACAF)
1978 FIFA World Cup qualification (CAF)

References

AFC and OFC
FIFA World Cup qualification (AFC)
FIFA World Cup qualification (OFC)
Qual
Qual
qual
qual
FIFA World Cup
qual